This is a list of administrators and governors of Borno State, Nigeria.
Borno State was formed on 3 February 1976 when North-Eastern State was divided into Bauchi, Borno, and Gongola states.

See also
States of Nigeria
List of state governors of Nigeria

References

Borno